Deschler is a German language occupational surname for a purse- or bagmaker. Notable people with the name include:

 Joachim Deschler (c.1500–1571), German sculptor and medalist
 Lewis Deschler (1903–1976), American politician

See also
 Teschner
 Purser (surname)

References

German-language surnames
Occupational surnames